Dr. Kourosh Safavi (born 27 June 1956, in Tehran, Iran) is an Iranian linguist, translator and university professor. He is the vice-president of Linguistics Society of Iran and a leading professor in Allameh Tabataba'i University, Tehran, Iran.  His activities revolve around semantics, semiotics, history of linguistics and the relationship between linguistics and literature.

One of the most prolific writers and translators on linguistics, Safavi has authored renowned books such as An Introduction to Linguistics, Wandering in the Philosophy of Literature, Logic in Linguistics, Literature from Linguistics Standpoint, Acquaintance with Written Systems, Introduction to the History of Iranian Languages, and Applied Semantics. He also has translated many books into Persian written by notable linguists and writers such as Noam Chomsky (Language and Mind and Language and Thought), Roman Jakobson, Ferdinand de Saussure (Course in General Linguistics), Hösle , Goethe (West-östlicher Diwan) and Jostein Gaarder (Sophie's World).

Early life and career
He was born in Tehran, Iran in 1956 from a Law-graduated father; Dr. Ahmad Emad al_Din Safavi and a Persian literature graduated mother; Parvindokht Javidpour. When he was only two months old the family migrated to Switzerland, Germany and finally Austria. 14 years later they returned to Iran and he got a mathematics diploma from Hadaf high school in Tehran. He first studied Chemical engineering in Shiraz university but finally came back to Tehran and studied German language and literature course of Tehran university. There, he participated in Persian literature courses held by Dr. Shafi'ee Kadkani and Dr. Ali Ravaghi.

He was acquainted with linguistic and philological debates in his youth, because his father used to talk about these topics in some discussions with many notable people such as Dr. Parviz Natel Khanlari.

He got his bachelor's degree of German language in 1971 and master's degree of Linguistics in 1979 and his Linguistics doctorate in 1993 from Tehran university.

Bibliography

As writer
1981. Darâmad-i bar Zabânshenâsi [An Introduction to Linguistics]. Tehran: Bongâh-e-Tarjomeh va Nashre-e Ketâb.
1982.Vâenâme-ye Zabânshenâsi [Glossary of Linguistics]. Tehran: Nashr-e- Mojarrad.
1988. Negâh-i be Pishine-ye Zabân-e Fârsi [A short History of Persian Language]. Tehran: Nashr-e- Markaz.
1992. Haft Goftâr darbâre-ye Tarjome [ Seven Essays on Translation].Tehran: Nashr-e Markaz.
1994. Az Zabânshenâsi be Adabiyyât [ From Linguistics to Literature. Vol. 1: Verse]. Tehran: Nashr-e- Cheshmeh.
2000. Darâmad-i bar Ma’nishenâsi [An Introduction to Semantics]. Tehran: Pazhuheshgâh-e Farhang va Honar-e Eslâm-i.
2001. Goftârhâ-yi dar Zabânshenâsi [Essays on Linguistics]. Tehran: Hermes.
2001. Az Zabânshenâsi be Adabiyyât [From Linguistics to Literature, Vol. 2: Poetry]. Tehran: Pazhuheshgâh-e Farhang va Honar-e Eslâm-i.
2001. Manteq dar Zabânshenâsi [Logic in Linguistics]. Tehran: Pazhuheshgâh-e Farhang va Honar-e Eslâm-i.
2003. Ma’nishenâsi-ye Kârbordi [Applied Semantics]. Tehran: Hamshahri.
2006. Farhang-e Towsifi-ye Ma’nishenâsi [Descriptive Dictionary of Semantics]. Tehran: Farhang-e Mo’âser.
2007. Âshnâyi bâ Ma’nishenâsi [Understanding Semantics]. Tehran: Pezhvak.
2007. Âshnâyi bâ Nezâmhâ-ye Neveshtâri [An Introduction to Writing Systems]. Tehran; Pezhvak
2007. Âshnâyi bâ Târix-e Zabânshenâsi [A Short History of Linguistics]. Tehran: Pezhvak.
2007. Âshnâi bâ Târix-e Zabânhâ-ye Irâni [A Short History of Iranian Languages]. Tehran: Pezhvak.
2006. Adabiyyât va Zabânshenâsi [Literature and Linguisitcs]. Tehran: Anjoman-e `â’erân-e  Irân.

As translator
Palmer, F.R. 1976. Semantics: A New Outline. K. Safavi (trsn. Persian). 1987. [Negâh-i Tâze be Ma’nienâsi]. Tehran, Nashr-e Markaz.
Gaur, A. 1986. A History of Writing- 1988 [Târix-e Xat]. Tehran: Nashr-e Markaz.
Bürgel, J. Ch. 1976. Drei Hafiz Studien- 1986. [Se Resâle darbâre-ye Hâfez]. Tehran: Nashr-e Markaz.
Jakobson, R. 1976. Main Trends in the Science of Language - 1997[Ravandhâ-ye Bonyâdin dar Dâne-e Zabân] Tehran: Hermes.
Chomsky, N.1968. Language and Mind - 1998 [Zabân va Zehn]. Tehran: Hermes.
Saussure, F. de. 1916. Course de Linguistique Générale - 1998 [Dowre-ye Zabânenâsi-ye Omumi]. Tehran: Hermes.
Thrax, Dionysius, 2nd Century B.C. Tekhne Grammatike - 1998 [Fann-e Dastur]. Tehran: Hermes. 
Historisches Wörterbuch der Philosophie. (12 Essays) - 1999 [Zabânenâsi va Adabiyyât]. Tehran: Hermes.
Gaarder, J.1992. Sofies Welt. K. Safavi (trans. Persian) - Tehran: Pazhuheshgâh-e Farhangi. 
Culler, J.D. 1976. Ferdinand de Saussure - 2000. [Ferdinând do Sosur]. Tehran: Hermes.
Chomsky, N. 1976. Language and Thought - 2000 [Zabân va Andie]. Tehran. Hermes.
Goethe, J.W. von.1819 West Östliches Diwan - 2000 [Divân-e- Qarbi-arqi]. Tehran: Markaz-e-Goftegu-ye Tamaddonhâ and Hermes.
Collinge, N.E. (ed.). 1990. An Encyclopaedia of Language (4 Essays) - 2005. [Zabânhâ-ye Donyâ]. Tehran. So’âd.

References

External links
 Home page in Allameh Tabatabayi University website

1956 births
Living people
20th-century linguists
21st-century linguists
Linguists from Iran
Semanticists
People from Tehran
Iranian translators
Linguists of Iranian languages
Linguists of Persian
Translators of Johann Wolfgang von Goethe
Translators of Noam Chomsky
Translators of Ferdinand de Saussure
Faculty of Letters and Humanities of the University of Tehran alumni